The Khuren Dukh Formation, also known as the Hühteeg Svita, is a geological formation in Mongolia whose strata date back to the middle to late Albian. Dinosaur remains are among the fossils that have been recovered from the formation.

Vertebrate paleofauna

Dinosaurs

Choristoderes

See also 
 List of dinosaur-bearing rock formations

References

Bibliography 

    
   
  
 

Geologic formations of Mongolia
Lower Cretaceous Series of Asia
Cretaceous Mongolia
Albian Stage
Sandstone formations
Mudstone formations
Lacustrine deposits
Paleontology in Mongolia
Formations